Prithvi Nath Kaula (1924-2009) was an Indian librarian, Library and Information Sciences specialist and author who worked with the Banaras Hindu University in Varanasi, India. Kaula authored sixty books and monographs, six professional journals (founder-editor), over 400 scholarly journal, over 400 peer review, 43 bibliographies and 6000 notes. Kaula was also the recipient of the Padma Shri award in the year 2004.

Early life
Prithvi Nath Kaula was born in 1924 in Srinagar, Jammu and Kashmir, British India into a Kashmiri Pandit family. His family belonged to the lower middle class. He completed his higher education Faculty of Arts in the Banaras Hindu University in Varanasi. In 1947, he was employed as a Librarian with the Birla Education Trust in Pilani. He later on became the Librarian at Central Library, BHU, Head of Department of Library and Information Science, BHU and the Dean of Faculty of Arts in the Banaras Hindu University.

References

Scholars from Varanasi
Banaras Hindu University alumni
Academic staff of Banaras Hindu University
Banaras Hindu University people
People from Srinagar
1924 births
Indian people of Kashmiri descent
Kashmiri people
Kashmiri Pandits
Recipients of the Padma Shri in literature & education
2009 deaths
Indian librarians
20th-century Indian educational theorists
20th-century Indian essayists